George Archibald Watkins (June 4, 1900 – June 1, 1970) was a Major League Baseball player, born in Freestone County, Texas who owns the National League record for the highest batting average in his rookie season, batting .373 in his rookie year of , with the St. Louis Cardinals.

He went on to play until the  season with the New York Giants, the Philadelphia Phillies (-1936), and Brooklyn Dodgers (1936), never again posting a batting average over .312.  On June 24, Watkins hit three home runs in one game.

In 894 games played, Watkins compiled a .288 batting average (925-3207) with 490 runs scored, 73 home runs, 420 RBI, a .347 on-base percentage and a .443 slugging percentage in 7 major league seasons. He posted a career .956 fielding percentage. In 9 World Series games, he batted .231 (6-26), scoring 6 runs, with 2 home runs and 3 RBI.

References

External links

 George Watkins - Baseballbiography.com
 

1900 births
1970 deaths
Baseball players from Texas
Major League Baseball right fielders
St. Louis Cardinals players
New York Giants (NL) players
Philadelphia Phillies players
Brooklyn Dodgers players
Houston Buffaloes players
Marshall Indians players
Austin Senators players
Beaumont Exporters players
Rochester Red Wings players